Phytoecia guilleti is a species of beetle in the family Cerambycidae. It was described by Maurice Pic in 1906.

Subspecies
 Phytoecia guilleti guilleti Pic, 1906
 Phytoecia guilleti callosicollis Pic, 1933

References

Phytoecia
Beetles described in 1906